Perth, Western Australia was occupied by British settlers in 1829 and originally named the Swan River Colony. Many of the older buildings are still extant, and have been heritage-listed. The places are listed here in chronological order and include significant buildings in the Perth metropolitan area.  Included are examples of governmental, religious, residential, commercial and institutional buildings. Places of identified heritage significance in metropolitan and regional Western Australia are listed in the official "InHerit" database which includes the State Register of Heritage Places, local government inventories and other lists, the Australian Government's heritage list, and other non-government lists and surveys.

Western Australia’s settlements struggled in the 1800s from lack of resources, labour and investment. The gold rushes of the 1890s brought a great influx of people from interstate and overseas, and considerable development arising from the new wealth. Many ornate and substantial buildings were constructed in the metropolitan area from the 1890s to the early-mid 1900s, including the Palace Hotel, Perth, the Esplanade Hotel, Fremantle, His Majesty's Theatre, Perth and the Old Perth Technical School.

In the late 1950s, a group of individuals who were concerned for the need to "preserve our heritage" came together to form the National Trust of Australia (WA) in 1959. The National Trust’s mandate was to educate the public on the importance of valuing our landscapes. At this time, there was no legislation or a statutory body in WA to formally recognise and protect heritage places. The National Trust was able to promote and bring attention to the significance of the state's heritage places including natural landscapes and buildings which were supported by heritage assessments of buildings with a classification system. In 1965, an Act of Parliament established the National Trust as a statutory body in WA and properties were able to be vested under the responsibility of the organisation.

A mining boom in the 1960s-70s led to another wave of intensive development in Perth and as a result the city lost many of its early 1900s buildings, particularly along St Georges Terrace. From this time, a greater awareness in the community of the loss of heritage places developed as demonstrated by several high profile public campaigns for the Pensioner Barracks (now the Barracks Arch), the Palace Hotel on St Georges Terrace and the Swan Brewery.

The lack of statutory protection for heritage places was a serious issue in WA and it wasn’t until the adoption of the Heritage Act of WA 1990 and the formation of the Heritage Council that post-colonial heritage places were given recognition and statutory protection under the State Register of Heritage Places. This work is undertaken by the State Heritage Office which supports the Heritage Council and Minister for Heritage. Aboriginal heritage places are dealt with separately under the Aboriginal Heritage Act 1972.

Further, under the Heritage Act of WA 1990, each local government in Western Australia is required to compile a Municipal Heritage Inventory which identifies places of heritage significance within their municipality.

The National Trust of Australia (WA) since the early 1960s has maintained a List of Classified Places. Classification by the National Trust does not provide statutory protection; instead these assessments provide a record of heritage places (historic, natural and Aboriginal) and support the Trust’s education and advocacy programs. The National Trust's List of Classified Places can be searched via the "inHerit" website.

Thousands of places across Western Australia have been recognised for their heritage significance. The recognition, protection and conservation of these heritage places has developed from individuals and communities who value these places and understand the contribution they make to WA’s history, culture and environment.

List

See also
List of heritage places in Fremantle
History of Perth, Western Australia
:Category:Heritage places of Western Australia

References

Further reading
 Austen, Tom The Streets of Old Perth St George Books. 1988. 
 Le Page, J. S. H. Building a state : the story of the Public Works Department of Western Australia 1829-1985 Leederville, W.A : Water Authority of Western Australia, 1986. 
 Stannage, C. T The people of Perth : a social history of Western Australia's capital city  Perth : Carroll's for Perth City Council, 1979. 
 Witcomb A and Gregory K From the Barracks to the Burrup: the National Trust in Western Australia University of New South Wales Press Ltd, Sydney. 2010.

External links
Perth.gov: Self-guided walking tour of listed buildings in Perth
Western Australia Heritage Council website

History of Perth, Western Australia
.Heritage buildings
Heritage buildings
Perth
Heritage places in Perth, Western Australia